The Berliner-Joyce XF2J was the company's second biplane fighter for the United States Navy. The XF2J was ordered on 30 June 1931 and although designated as a two-seat fighter, it was used as an observation aircraft.

Design and development
The XF2J's construction was all-metal with a fabric covered rudder. The upper wing was "gulled", with a short, sharply upward-angled section, with the remainder of the wing with a slight dihedral. The lower wing span was shorter than the upper wing, and was braced with "N" struts and wires. A .30 calibre machine gun was located in each of the gulled sections of the upper wing and were synchronized to fire through the propeller arc.

The tightly-cowled 9-cylinder Pratt & Whitney R-1690C Hornet was the engine originally specified, but was changed to the  14-cylinder Wright SR-1510-92 Whirlwind before the aircraft flew. The propeller was a metal constant speed two-blade design.

The original open cockpits were modified to sliding canopies shortly after delivery to the navy.

Operational history
The XF2J-1 suffered from the same faults as the P-16, resulting in an unfavourable service trial of the one prototype, which had appeared two years late due to a protracted development phase, exacerbated by financial difficulties that eventually led to the demise of the company  The poor visibility over the nose and the landing characteristics doomed the XF2J-1, especially in light of the availability of the superior Grumman FF-1.

Specifications (XF2J-1)

See also

References

Notes

Bibliography

 Bowers, Peter M, Forgotten Fighters/1 US Navy, 1918–1941 ARCO Publishing, New York, 1971, 
 W.Green, D.Swanborough The Complete Book of Fighters, 2000

External links

 Berliner-Joyce XF2J-1

F2J
Gull-wing aircraft
1930s United States fighter aircraft
Aircraft first flown in 1933
Single-engined tractor aircraft
Carrier-based aircraft